Esperanza Lemos (born as Esperanza Lemos Sevilla in Spain) is a Spanish actress, who mostly appears in the theatre, but she also had roles in TV series.

Filmography 
La mujer de tu vida 2 (1994)
MIR (2007)
Cuéntame cómo pasó (2007) — A sick woman
Con pelos en la lengua (2009)
El abrigo (2013) 
La ley del embudo (2018) — Vanesa López

Family 
Esperanza is a daughter of the actress Rosa Fontana (Rosa Engracia Sevilla Plo) – the daughter of the poet Avelino Sevilla Hernández and his wife – and her second husband, Carlos Manuel Lemos (son of the actor Carlos Lemos).

References

Spanish stage actresses
Living people
Year of birth missing (living people)